This is the list of number-one singles in Japan during 1990 according to Oricon Chart.

References 

1990 in Japanese music
Japan
Oricon 1990